Pathrusim together with Casluhim were descendants of Mizraim (i.e., Egypt) according to the genealogies in Genesis, who inhabited Pathros (i.e., Upper Egypt).

In the Book of Jacher, the Pathrusim and Casluhim intermarried resulting in the Pelishtim, Azathim, Gerarim, Githim and Ekronim.

See also
 Generations of Noah

References

Hebrew Bible nations
Noach (parashah)
Upper Egypt
Casluhim
Mizraim